... sofferte onde serene ... (Italian for "serene waves suffered" or "serene waves endured"),  42, is a composition for piano and tape by Italian composer Luigi Nono. The Archivio Luigi Nono uses the form ..... sofferte onde serene ..., derived from the cover of the manuscript.

Composition 
Composed in 1976, this was one of the pieces Nono wrote for piano when he was involved in a professional collaboration with pianist Maurizio Pollini, which started in Como una ola de fuerza y luz. It is considered to be the first composition in his compositional career's new phase after finishing his second stage work Al gran sole carico d'amore, composed between 1972 and 1975, where he abandoned his use of contrapuntalism, heterogeneous materials and big contrasts that made Nono well known in the past. Nono wanted to integrate in it some personal elements of both himself and Pollini, specially the sorrow for the death of both their relatives and the sound world of Nono's home town Venice. The piece was finished in 1976 in Giudecca and was dedicated to both Maurizio and Marilisa Pollini, whereas the tape part was recorded at the Studio di fonologia della Rai, in Milan, with Pollini and sound technician Marino Zuccheri. The premiere took place at Milan Conservatory's Sala Verdi on 17 April 1977, with Pollini at the piano, Marino Zuccheri as the sound technician and Luigi Nono himself as the sound supervisor. It was later published by Ricordi in 1977 and 1992, but musicologist Paulo de Assis published a prototype critical edition in 2009.

Structure 

... sofferte onde serene ... is in only one movement and has a total duration of fourteen minutes exactly, since tempo markings are very strict and tempo variations based on performance are rare. It consists of a total of 155 bars. The original tape recorded by Nono and still used in concert performances has a duration of thirteen minutes and thirty-nine seconds. Nono also included up to eight reference numbers in the score in order to keep the piano and the tape synchronized.

 00:54 – Begin after three seconds
 01:56 – Begin after three seconds
 02:57 – Begin immediately
 05:11 – Begin immediately
 06:49 – Begin immediately
 09:16 – Begin immediately
 11:49 – Begin immediately
 13:14 – Begin after two seconds

This composition calls for an on-stage piano, a mixer and a sound engineer meant to be placed off-stage, and four loudspeakers: two placed on the piano and two more placed on the bottom-left and bottom-right corner of the stage. The piece starts with the piano at a tempo of  = ca. 60. However, Nono marks further tempo changes in almost every bar. Since the piano is present both on-stage and in the tape recording, the sounds are meant to blend and create a uniform texture, far from his previous violent and contrasting style.

Recordings 

The following is a list of notable performances of this composition:

Notes

References

Further reading 
Carvalho, Mário Vieira de. 1999. "Towards Dialectic Listening: Quotation and Montage in the Work of Luigi Nono". Contemporary Music Review 18, no. 2:37–85.
Caselli, Massimo. 1992. "... sofferte onde serene ... de Luigi Nono". Revista Música 3, no. 1:17.
Harris, John Mark. 2003. "Performing Luigi Nono's ... sofferte onde serene ...". DMA diss. La Jolla: University of California, San Diego.
Linden, Werner. 1989. Luigi Nonos Weg zum Streichquartett: Vergleichende Analysen zu Seinen Kompositionen Liebeslied, ... sofferte onde serene ..., Fragmente, Stille, An Diotima. Kassel: Bärenreiter. .
Miller, Darren. 2014. "The Collaborative Role of the Technician in ... onde sofferte serene ...". Revista Vortex 2, no. 1:37–47.
Riede, Berndt. 1986. Luigi Nonos Kompositionen mit Tonband: Ästhetik des musikalischen Materials, Werkanalysen, Werverzeichnis. Berliner Musikwissenswchaftliche Arbeiten 28. Muniuch: E. Kartzbichler.
Rizzardi, Veniero. 1999. "Notation, Oral Practice and Performance Practice in the Works with Tape and Live Electronics by Luigi Nono". Contemporary Music Review 18, no. 1:47–56.
Spangemacher, Friedrich. 1983. Luigi Nono, die elektronische Musik: historischer Kontext, Entwicklung, Kompositionstechnik. Forschungsbeiträge zur Musikwissenschaft 29. Regensburg: G. Bosse.

External links 
 Manuscript of title page in Casa Ricordi Digital Collection
 , Hideki Nagano (piano), Ensemble InterContemporain
 , Alfonso Gómez, (piano), Roland Breitenfeld, electronics 

Compositions by Luigi Nono
1976 compositions
Music dedicated to ensembles or performers